Avishek Sinha (born 19 October 1984 ) is an Indian cricketer. He is a left-handed batter and slow left arm bowler. He made his first-class debut for Services in the 2008–09 Ranji Trophy on 3 November 2008.

References

External links
 

1984 births
Living people
Indian cricketers
Services cricketers
People from Siwan, Bihar